DZLB-FM (97.4 MHz Los Baños) is a radio station owned and operated by the University of the Philippines Los Baños - College of Development Communication. Its studio and transmitters are located in the DZLB Broadcast Studio of UP Los Baños College, Los Baños, Laguna. It is the premiere college radio station in the Philippines. It started operation in the mid-90s.

Its programming includes music programs and talk shows. Broadcasts are done from Monday to Friday, 3:00 PM to 7:00 PM. However, during weekends and breaks between semesters, the station is off the air. It also serves as the community radio station of U.P. Los Baños and other neighboring communities.

The station is under the direct supervision of the Department of Development Broadcasting and Telecommunication (DDBT) of the College of Development Communication. The station's broadcast team consists of volunteer student broadcasters from student organizations The UPLB Jocks and some members of the UP Community Broadcasters' Society.

See also
DZUP
DZLB

References

External links
Philippines FM Frequencies

College radio stations in the Philippines
Community radio stations in the Philippines
Radio stations established in 1964
Radio stations in Laguna (province)
University of the Philippines Los Baños